The Albert Hassler Trophy has been awarded to the most valuable French player in the Ligue Magnus since 1978. It is named after Albert Hassler, a French ice hockey player who played during the 1920s and 1930s.

Winners

External links
 Fédération Française de Hockey sur Glace

Ligue Magnus
France
French ice hockey trophies and awards
Most valuable player awards